William McLeod Hume (1 December 1937 – 10 December 2005) was a footballer.

Born in Alloa, Scotland, Hume signed as an apprentice for Hibernian in 1955, before emigrating to New Zealand the following year. Hume represented both New Zealand and Australia at international level.

His senior career began with Hamilton Wanderers before he moved to Australia to join Gladesville-Ryde in the NSW Premier League, and later playing for Sydney Hakoah. He returned to New Zealand in the early 1960s playing out his career with club side Hamilton Wanderers.

Hume made his full All Whites debut in a 2–3 loss to Australia on 16 August 1958 and made four more appearances over the following month, scoring a total of six goals, the last of his A-international caps being in a 2–1 win over New Caledonia on 14 September 1958.

He moved to Australia in 1959 and later that year he made his two appearances for Australia in unofficial matches against Scottish club Heart of Midlothian in Sydney and Melbourne, scoring in the Melbourne match.

Hume died of a heart attack on St Andrews golf course on 10 December 2005.

References

2005 deaths
New Zealand association footballers
Scottish footballers
Scottish emigrants to New Zealand
Australian soccer players
New Zealand international footballers
Australia international soccer players
Dual internationalists (football)
Association football forwards
1937 births
Hibernian F.C. players